Kolbenova is a Prague Metro station on Line B. It was opened on 8 June 2001 as an addition to the previously opened section of Line B.

History
This station was once a ghost station from 1998 to 2001. The station was in a state of suspended construction as the heavy industry factories it should have served were closed after the Velvet Revolution. Trains slowed when passing through the dimly lit station. As the whole industrial area was slowly revitalised, the station was finally completed.

The station is located on a street named in honor of Emil Kolben, an engineer and entrepreneur from Bohemia who died in the Theresienstadt concentration camp.

References

External links

 Gallery  
 Kolbenova Metro Station on Architecture News Plus

Prague Metro stations
Railway stations opened in 2001
2001 establishments in the Czech Republic
Railway stations in the Czech Republic opened in the 21st century